Martin Šulík (born October 20, 1962, in Žilina) is a Slovak film director. He studied film directing at the Academy of Performing Arts in Bratislava from which he graduated in 1986. His 2011 film Gypsy was selected as the Slovak entry for the Best Foreign Language Film at the 84th Academy Awards, but it did not make the final shortlist.  Martin Sulik is also an avid painter and has had his artwork shown in Bratislava Galleries.

Filmography
 The Position (1989)
 Tenderness (1992)
 Everything I Like (1993)
 The Garden (1995)
 Orbis Pictus (1997)
 Landscape (2000)
 The Key to Determining Dwarfs (2002)
 The City of the Sun (2005)
 Gypsy (2011)
 The Interpreter (2018)

References

External links

1962 births
Czechoslovak film directors
Living people
People from Žilina
Slovak film directors
Sun in a Net Awards winners